Osee Robert Fagan (1924 - December 2014) was a lawyer, prosecutor, state legislator, and judge in Florida. His wife was murdered by a deaf mute man he was prosecuting. He was born in Mississippi. His father was a Baptist preacher.

Fagan received a Purple Heart for injuries he received during service in the U.S. Army at the Battle of the Bulge.

A Democrat, he represented Alachua County in the Florida House of Representatives. The Florida Archives have a 1959 photo of him.

References

1924 births
2014 deaths
Florida lawyers
Members of the Florida House of Representatives